Corypha microclada is a species of flowering plant in the family Arecaceae. It is found only in the Philippines.It is threatened by habitat loss.

References

microclada
Endemic flora of the Philippines
Trees of the Philippines
Taxa named by Odoardo Beccari
Taxonomy articles created by Polbot

Critically endangered flora of Asia